Tiruvelukkai located in Kanchipuram in the South Indian state of Tamil Nadu, is dedicated to the Hindu god Vishnu. Constructed in the Dravidian style of architecture, the temple is glorified in the Nalayira Divya Prabandham, the early medieval Tamil canon of the Alvar saints from the 6th–9th centuries CE. It is one of the 108 Divya Desams dedicated to Vishnu, who is worshipped as Aḻagiya Singar (Narasimha) and his consort Lakshmi as Amruthavalli.

The temple is believed to have been built by the Pallavas of the late 8th century CE, with later contributions from Medieval Cholas and Vijayanagara kings. The temple has three inscriptions on its walls, two dating from the period of Kulothunga Chola I (1070–1120 CE) and one to that of Rajadhiraja Chola (1018-54 CE). A granite wall surrounds the temple, enclosing all the shrines and two bodies of water. There is a 3-tiered rajagopuram, the temple's gateway tower, in the temple.

Aḻagiya Singar is believed to have appeared to slay Hiranyakashipu, the tyrannical asura king. Six daily rituals and three yearly festivals are held at the temple, of which the Krishna Janmasthami festival, celebrated during the Tamil month of Avani (August–September), being the most prominent. The temple is maintained and administered by the Hindu Religious and Endowment Board of the Government of Tamil Nadu.

Legend

Velukkai is derived from Vel (desire) and irukkai (place of stay), meaning the place where Vishnu desired to stay, which became Velukkai from Velirukkai. It is believed that the original image of the temple was east facing standing posture of Vishnu as he appeared for Bhrigu Maharishi and later appeared as Aḻagiya Singar. According to the temple's regional legend, once, there was an argument between Saraswati, the consort of Brahma and Lakshmi on superiority. They went to Indra, the king of the celestial deities. Indra judged Lakshmi as superior. Not satisfied with his argument, Saraswati went to her husband, Brahma. He also chose Lakshmi to be the superior one. Saraswati was unhappy with the decision and decided to stay away from Brahma. Brahma did a severe penance praying to Vishnu and did an ashvamedha yajna. Saraswati was still angry that the yajna, which usually is done along with consorts was done alone by Brahma. She tried to disrupt the penance in various ways, but Vishnu interfered in all her attempts. After all the demons were killed by Vishnu, who were sent by Saraswati to destroy the yajna (penance) done by Brahma, she sent Kapalika, a demon. Vishnu took the form of Narhari to kill the demon.

Architecture
The presiding deity is Narasimhar (also called Mukunda Nayaka) is depicted in a seated posture facing West. The temple is located close to the Tiruththanka temple in Vishnu Kanchipuram. The temple has three shrines, one each for the presiding deity Aḻagiya Singar, one for his consort Amruthavalli and other for Garuda.

Festivals and religious practices
The temple follows the traditions of the Tenkalai sect of Vaishnava tradition and follows Vaikanasa Agama. The temple priests perform the puja (rituals) during festivals and on a daily basis. As at other Vishnu temples of Tamil Nadu, the priests belong to the Vaishnava community, from the Brahmin class. The temple rituals are performed six times a day: Ushathkalam at 7 a.m., Kalasanthi at 8:00 a.m., Uchikalam at 12:00 p.m., Sayarakshai at 6:00 p.m., Irandamkalam at 7:00 p.m. and Ardha Jamam at 10:00 p.m. Each ritual has three steps: alangaram (decoration), neivethanam (food offering) and deepa aradanai (waving of lamps) for both Aḻagiya Singar and Amruthavalli. During the last step of worship, nadasvaram (pipe instrument) and tavil (percussion instrument) are played, religious instructions in the Vedas (sacred text) are recited by priests, and worshippers prostrate themselves in front of the temple mast. There are weekly, monthly and fortnightly rituals performed in the temple.

Religious importance
The temple is revered in Nalayira Divya Prabandham, the 7th–9th century Vaishnava canon, by Peyalvar, Bhoothathalvar, Thirumalisai Alvar and Tirumangai Alvar. The Alvars have sung praise on the different forms of the deity. The temple is classified as a Divya Desam, one of the 108 Vishnu temples that are mentioned in the book. Many acharyas have also written songs on the various forms of God in this temple.

References

Sources

 
 

Divya Desams
Hindu temples in Kanchipuram